The Educational Foundation, Inc., better known as The Rams Club   is the athletic booster club and scholarship organization of the North Carolina Tar Heels at the University of North Carolina at Chapel Hill.  The Rams Club was founded on December 7, 1938  and has approximately 17,000 members as of November, 2019.  It is based at the Williamson Athletics Center,  located next to the Dean E. Smith Center, named for former executive director Ernie Williamson.

References

External links
 The Rams Club

 

1936 establishments in North Carolina
Sports foundations based in the United States
Non-profit organizations based in North Carolina
North Carolina Tar Heels
Organizations established in 1938